Bethanie Mattek-Sands and Nadia Petrova were the defenders of championship title; however, they chose not to play together.
Mattek-Sands partnered up with Yan Zi, but they lost to Natalie Grandin and Abigail Spears in the quarterfinals.
Petrova chose to play with Liezel Huber and they won in the final 6–3, 6–4, against Vania King and Michaëlla Krajicek.

Seeds

Draw

Draw

External links
 Main draw

Charleston Open
Family Circle Cup - Doubles